Flinders may refer to:

Places

Antarctica
 Flinders Peak, near the west coast of the Antarctic Peninsula

Australia

New South Wales
 Flinders County, New South Wales
 Shellharbour Junction railway station, Shellharbour
 Flinders, New South Wales, a suburb of Shellharbour

Queensland
 Electoral district of Flinders (Queensland), former state electoral district 
 Flinders Highway, Queensland
 Flinders Island (Queensland), part of the Great Barrier Reef Marine Park
 Flinders Reef
 Flinders River
 Flinders View, Queensland, a suburb of Ipswich
 Shire of Flinders (Queensland), a Local Government Area located in north western Queensland

South Australia
 County of Flinders, a cadastral unit
 Electoral district of Flinders, a state electoral district
 Flinders, South Australia, former name of the town of Streaky Bay.
 Flinders Highway, South Australia
 Flinders Island (South Australia), in the Investigator Group
 Flinders Medical Centre, the hospital associated with the Flinders University
 Flinders Park, South Australia, an inner-western suburb of Adelaide
 Flinders Ranges (disambiguation), articles associated with the mountain range
 Flinders Street, Adelaide 
 Flinders railway station
 Flinders University

Tasmania
 Flinders Council, a local government area
 Flinders Island, in the Furneaux Group, in Bass Strait

Victoria
 Division of Flinders, federal House of Representatives electoral division in Victoria
 Flinders Lane, Melbourne
 Flinders Naval Base and Flinders Naval Depot, former names of HMAS Cerberus (naval base)
 Flinders Street railway station
 Flinders Street, Melbourne 
 Flinders Street Viaduct
 Flinders, Victoria, a historic town south of Melbourne on the Mornington Peninsula
 Flinders Wharf, Melbourne 
 Melbourne Park formerly known as Flinders Park, home of the Australian Open Tennis Championships
 Shire of Flinders (Victoria)

Western Australia
 Flinders Bay

Canada
 Cape Flinders, in the northern Canadian territory of Nunavut

People
Flinders Petrie (1853–1942), English Egyptologist
Matthew Flinders (academic) (born 1972), British academic and political scientist
Matthew Flinders (1774–1814), British explorer, after whom all the geographic features listed above were directly or indirectly named.
Mesh Flinders (born 1979), American screenwriter
Scott Flinders (born 1986), English football goalkeeper

Other
Flinders (ship), several ships of this name, including:
HMAS Flinders (GS 312), a survey ship in service 1973-1998
Flinders (schooner), a South Australian Government vessel 1865–1873
The Flinders News, a South Australian newspaper published in Port Pirie
Flinders Ranges mogurnda, a gudgeon (fish)
10203 Flinders, an asteroid

See also

Flinders Island (disambiguation)